The 2019 Russian Mixed Doubles Curling Championship was held in Sochi from January 24 to 27, 2019.

First 14 teams (3 top teams from each group and 2 from additional qualification round for 4th-placed teams) qualified to next year championship. Champions team represented Russia on 2019 World Mixed Doubles Curling Championship.

Teams

Round Robin

Group A

Group B

Group C

Group D

Qualification games for 13th and 14th places

Playoffs

Final standings

References

External links
 Video:

See also
2019 Russian Men's Curling Championship
2019 Russian Women's Curling Championship
2019 Russian Mixed Curling Championship
2019 Russian Junior Curling Championships
2019 Russian Wheelchair Curling Championship

Russian Mixed Doubles Curling Championship
Russian Mixed Doubles Curling Championship
Curling Mixed Doubles Championship
Russian Mixed Doubles Curling Championship
Sports competitions in Sochi